Heathcliff ( Heathcliff and the Catillac Cats, known as Les Entrechats in French) is a children's animated series that debuted on September 3, 1984. Produced by DIC Audiovisuel, it was the second animated series based on the Heathcliff comic strip (after Ruby-Spears' Heathcliff from 1980). 65 half-hour episodes aired in first-run syndication in the fall of 1984, followed by a second season of 21 episodes in 1985 ran in syndication until it ended in 1988. The Catillac Cats characters (identified in the end credits as Cats and Co.) were created by Jean Chalopin and Bruno Bianchi.

Mel Blanc, who provided the voice of Heathcliff in the Ruby-Spears series, reprised his role as the titular cat.

Premise
Each episode featured two segments, one being about Heathcliff and his friends, while the other featured The Catillac Cats. At the end of every episode and before the end credits, Heathcliff or many other characters from the show would give out tips to viewers that are related to pet care. 

The year after the series ended, the film Heathcliff: The Movie was released, which consisted of a compilation of segments.

Cast
 Mel Blanc as Heathcliff
 Donna Christie as Cleo, Iggy
 Jeannie Elias as Marcy, Willie
 Stanley Jones as Riff-Raff, Wordsworth, Milkman
 Marilyn Lightstone as Sonja, Mrs. Nutmeg
 Danny Mann as Hector, Mr. Schultz
 Derek McGrath as Spike, Muggsy, Knuckles, Lefty
 Danny Wells as Bush, Raul
 Ted Zeigler as Leroy, Mungo, Mr. Nutmeg

Crew
 Head writer: Alan Swayze 
 Writers: Ann Elder, Doug Booth, Cynthia Chenault, Dan Dalton, Eliot Daro, Mike Dirham, Wilma Fraser, Evelyn Gabai, Mel Gilden, Chuck Lorre, George Hampton, Jack Hanrahan, Pamela Hickey, Walt Kubiak, Drew Laurence, Jim Makichuk, Dennys McCoy, Mike Moore, Charles Mulholland, Laura Numeroff, Mike O’Mahony, Leslie Page, Larry Parr, Bob Rosenfarb, David Schwartz, Mike Silvani, Bob Wilson
 Voice directors: Marsha Goodman, Victor Villegas (season 2)

Episodes

Series overview

Season 1 (1984)

Season 2 (1985)
NOTE: These episodes are listed in production order. This season was aired out of order.

Theme song
The theme was composed and written by Shuki Levy and Haim Saban and sung by Noam Kaniel.

Broadcast history
In the United States, the series was aired in national first-run syndication from September 3, 1984, with Season 2 having new episodes in 1985 in syndication airing until 1988, and then reruns of the series were aired on Nickelodeon from 1988 until 1993. The series then reran on Family Channel from 1993–1998 and Fox Family Channel for only a year from 1998 until 1999. From September 27, 2010 until September 23, 2011, reruns of the series were aired in the United States on the This Is for Kids block on This TV. Outside of Canada and the United States, the series was broadcast internationally on KidsCo, Fox Kids, and Jetix.

In the United Kingdom, the series first aired on the Children's BBC block on BBC One and was usually billed under the title Heathcliff Cats & Co. from 1988 until 1991. The "Cats & Co." name lasted until its last run on the BBC in 1991. The show then went over to Channel 4 and aired the show in the morning hours from 1990 until 1995. In 2000, the show went over to Toon Disney and began running the show shortly after its launch in the UK. However, during the same year back in the states, the show was aired in syndication on North American local stations in 2000 for a very short period of time, and went under its former BBC title Heathcliff Cats & Co. The series also aired in Japan. Back in the states, the series was aired on weekdays on Starz Encore Family (as of 2016). The show was also formerly broadcast in Colombia through the digital channel Tacho Pistacho until the channel's shutdown in 2019, and on Light TV in the United States from October 6, 2018 until September 30, 2019.

According to an interview with Donna Christie, the voice for Iggy Nutmeg and Cleo, the series did not continue because of Mel Blanc's failing health.

Home media
In the 1980s, the series was released on VHS from RCA/Columbia Pictures Home Video and Golden Book Video, with releases from the latter being released through the DIC Video label.

In February 2004, Sterling Entertainment released two VHS/DVD releases titled Terror of the Neighborhood and Fish Tales, each featuring six Heathcliff segments and a Catillac Cats segment. The DVD versions featured two additional Catillac Cats segments. On May 25, Sterling released Heathcliff: The Movie on DVD.

In 2004, General Mills offered free DVDs in select cereals with assorted cartoons, some of which had Heathcliff episodes on them.

In the UK, Maximum Entertainment released two volumes of the series in 2004. The first DVD/VHS contained 5 episodes, while the other DVD contained 3. A third one, released in 2008, contained 5 more episodes.

In September 2005, Shout! Factory and Sony BMG Music Entertainment released Heathcliff and The Catillac Cats in a 4-disc boxset featuring the first 24 episodes of the series in its original, complete and uncut television broadcast form. Shout! Factory has lost the rights to the series.

Throughout 2007–2009, NCircle Entertainment released eight Heathcliff DVDs.

In February 2012, Mill Creek Entertainment released Heathcliff- Season One, Volume 1 on DVD. This 3-disc set features the first 32 episodes from the Season 1 which includes a bonus episode of The Get Along Gang (originally The Busy World of Richard Scarry was meant to be the bonus episode). They also released a 10 episode best-of collection on that same day. Heathcliff- Season 1, Volume 2 was released on October 1, 2013, which contains the remaining 33 episodes from Season 1.

In August 2016, Mill Creek released Heathcliff – The Complete Series on DVD in Region 1. The 9-disc set contains all 86 episodes of the series, including the final 21 episodes which were previously unreleased.

The episode "Going Shopping / Cat in the Fat" was included as a bonus in the DVD release of the first half of the Beverly Hills Teens series.

In France, two more 4-disc sets were released under the French title of the series, Les Entrechats.

Streaming
Heathcliff, along with other DHX Media programming, was added to Paramount+ streaming service.

Movie
Heathcliff: The Movie was released to theaters on January 17, 1986, and subsequently on VHS in 1988 by Paramount Video. It includes seven segments from the original show:

 Cat Food for Thought
 Heathcliff's Double
 The Siamese Twins
 An Officer and an Alley Cat
 The Catfather
 Boom Boom Pussini
 Pop on Parole

References

External links

 Heathcliff at DHX Media Website
 
 

1984 American television series debuts
1988 American television series endings
1980s American daily animated television series
1984 Canadian television series debuts
1988 Canadian television series endings
1980s Canadian animated television series
1984 French television series debuts
1988 French television series endings
1980s French animated television series
American children's animated comedy television series
Canadian children's animated comedy television series
French children's animated comedy television series
Fox Kids
Television series by DIC Entertainment
First-run syndicated television programs in the United States
Nickelodeon original programming
BBC children's television shows
France Télévisions children's television series
France Télévisions television comedy
Heathcliff (comics)
Television shows based on comic strips
Animated television series about cats
Television series created by Jean Chalopin
Television shows adapted into comics